Mactaggart is a neighbourhood in southwest Edmonton, Alberta, Canada that was established in 2005 through the adoption of the Mactaggart Neighbourhood Area Structure Plan (NASP).

Mactaggart is located within Terwillegar Heights that was initially planned under the Terwillegar Heights Servicing Concept Design Brief (SCDB).

It is bounded on the west by Rabbit Hill Road (142 Street), north by the Magrath Heights neighbourhood, east and southeast by the Whitemud Creek ravine, and south by Anthony Henday Drive.

Demographics 

Surrounding neighbourhoods

References 

Neighbourhoods in Edmonton